Other Men's Shoes is a 1920 American silent drama film directed by Edgar Lewis and starring Crauford Kent, Irene Boyle, and Stephen Grattan.

Cast
 Crauford Kent as Stephen Browning 
 Irene Boyle as Irene Manton 
 Stephen Grattan as Dr. Manton 
 Jean Armour as Marion Browning 
 Harold Foshay as Jacob Dreener 
 John P. Wade as Raphael Creeke 
 Phil Sanford as Paget 
 Bobby Connelly as 'Doady'

References

Bibliography
 Goble, Alan. The Complete Index to Literary Sources in Film. Walter de Gruyter, 1999.

External links

1920 films
1920 drama films
Silent American drama films
Films directed by Edgar Lewis
American silent feature films
1920s English-language films
Pathé Exchange films
American black-and-white films
Films based on British novels
1920s American films